Peaches is the second extended play by South Korean singer Kai. It was released on November 30, 2021, by SM Entertainment. The EP contains six tracks including the lead single of the same name. The physical album is available in three versions (2 Photobook versions and one Digipack version).

Background and release
On October 26, 2021, SM Entertainment announced that Kai will release his second solo album in November 2021.

On November 11, it was announced that Kai will release his second extended play Peaches on November 30, 2021.

Composition
The title song "Peaches" features sweet vibes, raising expectations as you can also meet hip-hop-based songs that remind you of Kai's powerful performance. "Vanilla" is an indie-pop genre song that combines drowsy guitar, bongo, and tropical synthesizer sounds, comparing the feeling of falling in love with a soft vanilla taste, and the repeated chorus doubles the dreamy atmosphere of the song. The song "Domino" was described R&B hip-hop genre song with heavy bass, drums, and low-tone vocals which lyrically expresses that once it starts, let's move away from the gaze or worries of others and move as much as we want. "Come In" was described as a groovy hip-hop dance genre song that impresses the use of layered bases, synthesizers, and vocoders, with the lyrics that express the message of not hesitating in love and approaching boldly are eye-catching. "To Be Honest" is a song with a rhythmical main riff, drums, and 808 bass, with the lyrics about expressing each other's feelings honestly and not hiding their feelings anymore doubles their charm. "Blue" is a R&B pop genre song that combines lo-fi guitar and emotional piano performance, and depicts contradictory emotions about wanting to be alone but wanting someone to recognize and hold me.

Track listing

Charts

Weekly charts

Year-end charts

Certifications

Release history

Accolades

References

2021 EPs
Kai (entertainer, born 1994) EPs
Korean-language EPs
SM Entertainment EPs